The County of Benambra is one of the 37 counties of Victoria which are part of the cadastral divisions of Australia, used for land titles.  It is located between the Mitta Mitta River in the west, and the Murray River to the north and east. The town of Benambra is located near the southern edge. The area of the county roughly corresponds with the Electoral district of Benambra. Corryong is the largest town in the county. The county was proclaimed in 1871.

Parishes 
Parishes include:
 Adjie, Victoria
 Beloka, Victoria
 Benambra, Victoria
 Berringa, Victoria
 Berringama, Victoria
 Bullioh, Victoria
 Bungil East, Victoria
 Bungil, Victoria
 Burrowye, Victoria
 Burrungabugge, Victoria
 Canabore, Victoria
 Cobungra, Victoria
 Colac Colac, Victoria
 Corryong, Victoria
 Cudgewa, Victoria
 Dartella, Victoria
 Enano, Victoria
 Gibbo, Victoria
 Granya, Victoria
 Gungarlan, Victoria
 Hinno-Munjie, Victoria
 Indi, Victoria
 Jemba, Victoria
 Jinderboine, Victoria
 Jinjellic, Victoria
 Kancobin, Victoria
 Keelangie, Victoria
 Koetong, Victoria
 Kosciusko, Victoria
 Malkara, Victoria
 Mitta Mitta, Victoria
 Mowamba, Victoria
 Moyangul, Victoria
 Nariel, Victoria
 Pinnibar, Victoria
 Talgarno, Victoria
 Tatonga, Victoria
 Thologolong, Victoria
 Thorkidaan, Victoria
 Thowgla, Victoria
 Tintaldra, Victoria
 Towong, Victoria
 Wabba, Victoria
 Wagra, Victoria
 Walwa, Victoria
 Welumla, Victoria
 Wyeeboo, Victoria
 Yabba, Victoria

References
Vicnames, place name details
Research aids, Victoria 1910
Map of the counties of Benambra, Tambo, Croajingolong and Dargo in Victoria showing county boundaries, parish boundaries, main roads, telegraph lines and railways. 1886, J. Sands. National Library of Australia

Counties of Victoria (Australia)